Thomas Whalen (9 September 1931 – 2014) was a Scottish footballer who played for Berwick Rangers and Dumbarton.

References

1931 births
2014 deaths
Scottish footballers
Dumbarton F.C. players
Berwick Rangers F.C. players
Scottish Football League players
Association football inside forwards